Barbitistes vicetinus, the Vicentine saw-tailed bush-cricket, is a species of katydids crickets in family Phaneropteridae endemic to Italy. The species was originally described by Antonio Galvagni and Paolo Fontana. It is found in vineyards and woody vegetation in the regions of Veneto and Trentino, in particular in the province of Vicenza (from which it gets its name). Formally described as a new species only in 1993, unexpected population outbreaks have severely impacted forests and crops in northern Italy in recent years.

References 

Orthoptera of Europe
Insects described in 1993
Taxa named by Antonio Galvagni
Taxa named by Paulo Fontana
Phaneropterinae